Canada Dry Mott's, Inc. (d/b/a Keurig Dr Pepper Canada) is a beverage company based in Mississauga, Ontario, Canada. It is the Canadian division of Keurig Dr Pepper (KDP).

It was a subsidiary of Cadbury-Schweppes and was previously called Cadbury Beverages Canada Inc. Cadbury plc spun off its beverage division to form Dr Pepper Snapple Group in May 2008 and the name of the Canadian division was changed to the current name.

Brands 
Its major brands include:

 Canada Dry
 CPlus (Sunkist)
 Schweppes
 Orangina (until 2020)
 Snapple
 Dr Pepper
 Crush
 Hires and Vodka
 Mott's
 Clamato
 Mott's Mr & Mrs T

References

Drink companies of Canada
Companies based in Mississauga
Keurig Dr Pepper brands